Ian Murray (born 17 January 1970) is an Irish former rugby union player and coach.

Career
From Cork, McCarthy represented local amateur club Cork Constitution during his career, playing in the newly formed All-Ireland League in the 1990s, and also played for Munster between 1996 and 1999, featuring for the province in the IRFU Interprovincial Championship and Heineken Cup. After retiring from playing rugby, the former prop entered coaching, becoming scrum coach to Munster's underage teams.

References

External links
Munster Profile

Living people
1970 births
Rugby union players from County Cork
Irish rugby union players
Irish rugby union coaches
Cork Constitution players
Munster Rugby players
Rugby union props